Frutiger may refer to:

 Adrian Frutiger, Swiss typeface designer
 Frutiger (company), a Swiss construction company
 Frutiger (typeface), a typeface designed by the Swiss typeface designer Adrian Frutiger